Anjaam is a 1994 Indian Hindi-language psychological thriller film directed by Rahul Rawail. It stars Madhuri Dixit and Shah Rukh Khan in lead roles, with Tinnu Anand, Johnny Lever, Kalpana Iyer, Himani Shivpuri, Sudha Chandran, Beena, and Kiran Kumar in supporting, and Deepak Tijori in a special appearance. This was the first time that Dixit and Khan were paired together. The film's music was composed by Anand–Milind, with lyrics written by Sameer. The film is about a woman facing the brunt of her obsessive lover. It also focuses on the atrocities committed against women.

At the 40th Filmfare Awards, Anjaam won Khan the Best Villain award for his performance, after having failed to win the award the previous year for his performance in Yash Chopra's Darr. Moreover, the film also earned Dixit her 7th nomination for Best Actress, but she instead won the award for Hum Aapke Hain Koun..! Khan has bought the rights to this film under his banner, Red Chillies Entertainment.

Plot
Shivani Chopra is an air hostess for Air India. She lives with her sister Padmisha and her brother-in-law Mohanlal, who is a drunkard and bets all the money he can find on horse races. Shivani meets Vijay Agnihotri, a wealthy industrialist who is instantly infatuated with her but she shows no interest in him. Vijay is the owner of his family industries; he first tries to get Shivani model for them, but she does not even consider it. He continues to pursue her to be his lover, but is rejected every time. Vijay informs his mother Padma that he will only marry Shivani.

When they approach Shivani's family for her hand in marriage, they see that Shivani is already marrying Ashok Chopra, an Air India pilot. Vijay is heartbroken, shocked, and disappointed while Shivani and Ashok get posted right after their wedding and move to America.

Four years later, Vijay cannot forget Shivani and turned down all the marriage proposals brought by his mother. Shivani and Ashok have a daughter, Pinky. Shivani left her job as an air hostess and began volunteering at a hospital for the mentally and physically disabled. Vijay befriends Ashok in hopes of getting closer to Shivani. He plans to start his own airlines where he hires Ashok as a general manager with a high salary. Unaware of Vijay's intentions, Ashok doesn't believe Shivani who tries to convince him of Vijay's true face.

Vijay gives Shivani and Ashok a new company home, which after moving into, Shivani finds out she is pregnant. She shares the news with her husband but Vijay interrupts, revealing that he's used Shivani's photos as advertisements for the new airline. This enrages Shivani who demands that Vijay leave and then insists that Ashok quit his job as well as the new house, and that she will work to support the family instead.

Insulted and angered, Ashok slaps and disowns Shivani, who leaves the house much to his great regret. Vijay witnessing this has an episode and severely beats Ashok. When he is hospitalised, Vijay removes his oxygen mask in the presence of Shivani thereby killing him. She attempts to convince the police that Vijay is responsible for Ashok's death.

However, Vijay bribes his friend Inspector Arjun Singh to provide an alibi and is not charged despite Arjun telling him that what he did was wrong, Vijay refuses to stop thinking about Shivani despite being told to give her up. All this while, he visits and begs Shivani to say she loves him. As she refuses, he beats her up and frames her for his attempted murder. She is sentenced to 3 years in prison as she could not prove her innocence. Pinky is placed in the care of Padmisha and Mohanlal. Mohanlal mistreats his wife and calls Pinky a burden.

Shivani meets Nisha, her cellmate who was wrongly accused of murder in a case of dowry. They share their pain in prison under the watch of a brutal prison warden, who would force the prison inmates into prostitution for political leaders at night. In an attempt to escape from prison, she makes a complaint about the brutality of her prison guard but her plea is ignored. Instead, Inspector Arjun revealed to the warden it was Shivani who filed a complaint against her illegal activities.

Mohanlal forces Padmisha to disown Pinky, but she refuses. In response, he kicks both Padmisha and Pinky out. Vijay accidentally kills Shivani's sister and daughter by running his car over them. Shivani learns about their deaths and realises Vijay is the one who killed them. She decides to go to any length to avenge her family.

One day, Shivani vomits during a politicians' visit to take a prisoner for the night. When the prison guard learns that Shivani complained, she gives her a severe beating and throws her into a dark isolation cell, which causes her to have a miscarriage. With all of her loved ones have passed away, Shivani was numb to the world. Her only motive to live now was exacting revenge on all the people that wronged her.

She begins with the prison guard by planning a night-long worship event at the jail, staging an alibi for Shivani. She sneaks away and kills the prison warden by dragging her to the gallows and hanging her. As there is no evidence and a strong alibi, Shivani is not convicted for it.

Three years later, Shivani is released from prison. First, she kills Mohanlal by choking him with rupee notes and chewing off a significant amount of flesh from his arm. Inspector Arjun suspects Shivani for the murder. While Shivani is mourning her daughter at her grave, Inspector Arjun steps right on her grave to rudely intercept her. He chases her and attempts to rape her in a barn, but Shivani overpowers him and sets the barn on fire, leaving him to die.

Shivani visits Vijay's home but came to know that Vijay and his mother moved out of there two years ago. She decides to dedicate her life to serving the disabled at the hospital she used to volunteer at. The doctor there suggested she stay at their new sanatorium in Tikamgarh. When she gets there, she finds out that the sanatorium was built by Vijay's mother. Shivani found Vijay in a paralysed state at the sanatorium, losing his ability to move due to the car accident which killed Shivani's sister and daughter. She volunteers to rehabilitate him.

Vijay gets cured with Shivani's love and attention. Vijay tells Shivani once again to say she loves him and to marry him, as she has no other options in life. Shivani embraces him before stabbing him. She confesses that she nursed him to health for one purpose: to kill him, as it is a sin to kill an incapacitated person who cannot defend himself. In their scuffle, they end up dangling from a cliff with Vijay hanging onto Shivani's foot. Vijay says that if he falls to his death, he shall take Shivani with him. Deciding that it is more important for Vijay to die than for her to live, Shivani lets go, causing both of them to fall to their deaths.

Cast 
Madhuri Dixit as Shivani Chopra
Shahrukh Khan as Vijay Agnihotri
Sudha Chandran as Padmisha Singh, Shivani's sister and Mohanlal's wife.
Tinnu Anand as Mohanlal, Shivani's brother-in-law and Padmisha's husband.
Johnny Lever as Champa Chameli
Beena Banerjee as Mrs.Padma Agnihotri, Vijay's mother.
Himani Shivpuri as Nisha, Shivani's friend and confident in prison.
Kiran Kumar as Inspector Arjun Singh
Deepak Tijori as Ashok Chopra, Shivani's husband. (guest appearance)
Kalpana Iyer as Prison Warden
Dinesh Hingoo as Minister
Baby Gazala as Pinky Chopra, Ashok and Shivani's daughter.

Production
Anjaam marked the first of many collaborations between Dixit and Khan.

Soundtrack

Rakesh Budhu of Planet Bollywood gave the album 7.5 stars stating, "Anjaam's tunes are overall a mixed fare but the songs that were sweet and melodious were enough to project the soundtrack to higher standards. The only song that is sung by Abhijeet in this album, "Badi Mushkil Hai", is considered one of the most melodious songs till date".

Track listing

Awards and nominations

References

External links

 Anjaam Full Movie at Filmywrep

1994 films
1990s Hindi-language films
Films scored by Anand–Milind
Indian films about revenge
Films directed by Rahul Rawail
Films about women in India
Indian psychological thriller films
1990s psychological thriller films
Indian feminist films
Films about fear
Films about stalking
Films about domestic violence
Home invasions in film
Murder in films